Wendell Bill (8 April 1910 – 10 May 1988) was an Australian cricketer. He played 35 first-class matches for New South Wales between 1929/30 and 1934/35.

See also
 List of New South Wales representative cricketers

References

External links
 

1910 births
1987 deaths
Australian cricketers
New South Wales cricketers
Cricketers from Sydney